Paul Ryan is a fictional character on the CBS soap opera As the World Turns. The role was originated in 1980 and portrayed by several child actors until he was SORASed in 1986. The role was last portrayed by Roger Howarth who stepped into the role in 2003.

Casting
The role was originated by Canaan Crouch, the real-life son of Colleen Zenk and her former husband for several months in 1980. Later, three other child actors took over the role, including Danny Pintauro. Pintauro debuted in January 1983 and last appeared on February 10, 1984 and was quickly replaced by Elden Ratliff on February 13, 1984. Ratliff departed from the series in January 1985 and C. B. Barnes stepped into the role the following month; Barnes last appeared in January 1986. Damon Scheller stepped into the role in February 1986 on a recurring basis and last appeared in October 1986. In November 1986, Andrew Kavovit stepped into the role when the character was SORASed to age 16. In 1990, Kavovit earned the Daytime Emmy award in the Outstanding Younger Actor category for his portrayal of Paul. Kavovit last appeared on the series in October 1991, with a brief appearance in 1992. Actor John Howard stepped into the role briefly in 1996 but was quickly let go. In May 2001, it was announced that Scott Holroyd was cast in the role of Paul. Holroyd began taping in June and made his first appearance on July 10, 2001. Kevin Stapleton, known for his role as One Life to Live's Kevin Buchanan was also considered for the role. In March 2003, Holyroyd confirmed in an interview with TV Guide that he was departing from the series. Holroyd made his last appearance on May 13, 2003. Following the announcement about Holroyd's departure, rumors began circulating that Daytime Emmy winner Roger Howarth, known for his role as One Life to Live's Todd Manning was being considered for the role. In May 2003, after several weeks of speculation, CBS confirmed that Howarth had signed on to play Paul Ryan and Howarth made his first appearance on July 7, 2003.

Storylines

1983–91

1996

2001–10

See also 
 Paul Ryan and Meg Snyder

References

Further reading
 Nochimson, Martha. No End to Her: Soap Opera and the Female Subject. University of California Press, 1992. 174. Google Books. Web. Jan. 12, 2012. .

External links
Paul Ryan from soapcentral.com

Ryan, Paul
Television characters introduced in 1980
Fictional business executives
Male characters in television